John Maynard Street (December 12, 1898 – January 5, 1993) was an American football and basketball coach. Street was the head football coach at Kalamazoo College in Kalamazoo, Michigan. He held that position for the 1923 and 1924 seasons. His coaching record at Kalamazoo was 2–16.

Street was a stand-out football and basketball player and track athlete at Carleton College from 1916 to 1919, until doctors found he had a heart murmur half-way through the football season.

Head coaching record

Football

References

1898 births
1993 deaths
American men's basketball players
Carleton Knights football players
Carleton Knights men's basketball players
Kalamazoo Hornets football coaches
Kalamazoo Hornets men's basketball coaches
College men's track and field athletes in the United States
People from Lamberton, Minnesota
Coaches of American football from Minnesota
Players of American football from Minnesota
Basketball coaches from Minnesota
Basketball players from Minnesota
Track and field athletes from Minnesota